Living Space is a compilation album by jazz musician John Coltrane. Released posthumously by Impulse! Records on March 10, 1998, it features pieces recorded in 1965. Almost all of them had been previously issued on the Kulu Sé Mama ("Dusk Dawn") CD reissue and on The Mastery of John Coltrane, Vol. 1: Feelin' Good ("Living Space", "Untitled 90320" and "Untitled 90314"). The only previously unissued track is "Last Blues".

Reception
An AllMusic review states: "The album has the spacious intensity of Trane's latter-day compositions that jar, probe, and bend the horizontal and vertical dimensions of his earlier music while finding stability in the seasoned vigor of the band. 'Living Space' appears without strings here, its melody overdubbed by Trane, in unison, on both tenor and soprano. It has the searching, mysterious quality of a mantra unlocking unseen doors, and recalls the waxing fire of A Love Supreme'''s 'Resolution.' 'Untitled 90320' offers perhaps the most free environment of the five cuts, with McCoy hanging chordal fragments in thin air as Elvin sympathizes energetically with Trane's excursions into unexplored harmonic vistas. Think four dimensions or more."

Ryan Schreiber wrote: "What's amazing about these tracks is that they hadn't been compiled earlier because, as a record, Living Space ranks among Coltrane's best... From the vaults comes a gem so shiny that it'll blind you if you look directly into it. Living Space'' is more than just a pile of dusty old tapes. It's an album to which one can only lay back, close the eyes, and drift off into a land of sound where memories collapse and the heart attacks."

Track listing

Personnel
 John Coltrane – tenor saxophone, soprano saxophone
 McCoy Tyner – piano
 Jimmy Garrison – double bass
 Elvin Jones – drums

References

1998 compilation albums
John Coltrane compilation albums
Impulse! Records compilation albums
Compilation albums published posthumously
Albums produced by Bob Thiele
Albums recorded at Van Gelder Studio